The Drop Kick (also known as Glitter in the UK) is a 1927 silent film directed by Millard Webb written by Katherine Brush about a college football player (Richard Barthelmess). It was one of the early films of John Wayne who was only aged 20 in the film. He too played a college footballer. A mute silent print was transferred onto 16mm film by Associated Artists Productions in the 1950s and in 1960s by United Artists Television. Prints of the film are preserved at the Library of Congress and the Wisconsin Center for Film and Theater Research, Madison.

Plot

A football player finds his head coach is suffering from a suicide.

Cast
Richard Barthelmess as Jack Hamill 
Barbara Kent as Cecily Graves 
Dorothy Revier as Mrs. Hathaway 
Eugene Strong as Brad Hathaway
Alberta Vaughn as Molly 
Brooks Benedict as Ed Pemberton 
Hedda Hopper as Mrs. Hamill 
Mayme Kelso as Mrs. Graves 
George C. Pearce as The Dean 
John Wayne as USC Football Player
James Bradbury Jr. as the rival to Hamill

References

External links

 
alternate poster for the film
 still portrait Richard Barthelmess, Hedda Hopper

1927 films
American football films
Films directed by Millard Webb
American black-and-white films
American silent feature films
1920s sports films
1920s American films
Silent sports films